Scirtothrips is a genus of thrips in the family Thripidae.

Species

 Scirtothrips abditus Mound & Marullo, 1996
 Scirtothrips aceri Moulton, 1926
 Scirtothrips acus Wang, 1994
 Scirtothrips admangiferaffinis Johansen & Mojica-Guzman, 1999
 Scirtothrips africanus Faure, 1929
 Scirtothrips akakia Hoddle & Mound, 2003
 Scirtothrips albidus Masumoto & Okajima, 2007
 Scirtothrips albomaculuts Bianchi, 1945
 Scirtothrips albosilvicola Johansen & Mojica-Guzman, 1999
 Scirtothrips albus (Jones, 1912)
 Scirtothrips angusticomis Karny, 1922
 Scirtothrips apatzinganensis Johansen & Mojica-Guzman, 1999
 Scirtothrips asinus Wang, 1994
 Scirtothrips astibos Hoddle & Mound, 2003
 Scirtothrips astrictus Mound & Marullo, 1996
 Scirtothrips aurantii Faure, 1929
 Scirtothrips australiae Hood, 1919
 Scirtothrips aztecus Johansen & Mojica-Guzman, 1999
 Scirtothrips bisbravoae Johansen, 1983
 Scirtothrips bispinosus (Bagnall, 1924)
 Scirtothrips bondari Moulton, 1933
 Scirtothrips bounites Mound & Marullo, 1996
 Scirtothrips bournieri Berzosa & Cano, 1990
 Scirtothrips brevipennis Hood, 1914
 Scirtothrips canizoi Titschack, 1964
 Scirtothrips casuarinae Palmer & Mound, 1983
 Scirtothrips chamelaensis Johansen & Mojica-Guzman, 1999
 Scirtothrips citri (Moulton, 1909)
 Scirtothrips cognatoalbus Johansen & Mojica-Guzman, 1999
 Scirtothrips cognatosilvicola Johansen & Mojica-Guzman, 1999
 Scirtothrips combreti Faure, 1929
 Scirtothrips danieltelizi Johansen & Mojica-Guzman, 1999
 Scirtothrips dieterenkerlini Johansen & Mojica-Guzman, 1999
 Scirtothrips dignus zur Strassen, 1986
 Scirtothrips dobroskyi Moulton, 1936
 Scirtothrips dodonaeae Mound & Stiller, 2011
 Scirtothrips dorsalis Hood, 1919
 Scirtothrips drepanofortis Hoddle & Mound, 2003
 Scirtothrips eremicus Hoddle & Mound, 2003
 Scirtothrips euthyntus Mound & Marullo, 1996
 Scirtothrips ewarti Bailey, 1964
 Scirtothrips flavus Masumoto & Okajima, 2007
 Scirtothrips frondis Hoddle & Mound, 2003
 Scirtothrips fulleri Faure, 1929
 Scirtothrips fumipennis Jacot-Guillarmod, 1937
 Scirtothrips hainanensis Han, 1986
 Scirtothrips hectorganzalizi Johansen & Mojica-Guzman, 1999
 Scirtothrips helenae Palmer & Mound, 1983
 Scirtothrips hengduanicus Han, 1990
 Scirtothrips ikelus Mound & Marullo, 1996
 Scirtothrips inermis Priesner, 1933
 Scirtothrips juniperinus Pelikan, 1963
 Scirtothrips katsura Masumoto & Okajima, 2007
 Scirtothrips kenyensis Mound, 1968
 Scirtothrips kirrhos Hoddle & Mound, 2003
 Scirtothrips longipennis (Bagnall, 1909)
 Scirtothrips litotetes Hoddle & Mound, 2003
 Scirtothrips loennbergi (Trybom, 1912)
 Scirtothrips longipennis (Bagnall, 1909)
 Scirtothrips lumarius Mound & Marullo, 1996
 Scirtothrips machili Masumoto & Okajima, 2007
 Scirtothrips mangiferae Priesner, 1932
 Scirtothrips mangiferaffinis Johansen & Mojica-Guzman, 1999
 Scirtothrips mangoaffinis Johansen & Mojia-Guzman, 1999
 Scirtothrips mangofrequentis Johansen & Mojica-Guzman, 1999
 Scirtothrips mangoinfestans Johansen & Mojica-Guzman, 1999
 Scirtothrips mangomolestus Johansen & Mojica-Guzman, 1999
 Scirtothrips mangonoxius Johansen & Mojica-Guzman, 1999
 Scirtothrips mangorum Johansen & Mojica-Guzman, 1999
 Scirtothrips manihoti Bondar, 1924
 Scirtothrips martingonzalezi Johansen & Mojica-Guzman, 1999
 Scirtothrips moneres Hoddle & Mound, 2003
 Scirtothrips multistriatus Hood, 1954
 Scirtothrips mugambii Mound, 2010
 Scirtothrips musciaffinis Johansen & Mojica-Guzman, 1999
 Scirtothrips niveus Hood, 1913
 Scirtothrips novomangorum Johansen & Mojica-Guzman, 1999
 Scirtothrips nubicus Priesner, 1936
 Scirtothrips oligochaetus (Karny, 1927)
 Scirtothrips pan Mound & Walker, 1982
 Scirtothrips panamensis Hood, 1935
 Scirtothrips pendulae Han, 1986
 Scirtothrips perseae Nakahara, 1997
 Scirtothrips pilbara Hoddle & Mound, 2003
 Scirtothrips prosopsis Hood, 1939
 Scirtothrips pteridicola Ananthakrishnan, 1968
 Scirtothrips pteridis Mound & Marullo, 1996
 Scirtothrips quadriseta Hoddle & Mound, 2003
 Scirtothrips ruthveni Shull, 1909
 Scirtothrips silvatropicalis Johansen & Mojica-Guzman, 1999
 Scirtothrips silvicola Johansen & Mojica-Guzman, 1999
 Scirtothrips solaris Bailey, 1964
 Scirtothrips solus Hoddle & Mound, 2003
 Scirtothrips spinosus Faure, 1929
 Scirtothrips taxendii Hood, 1954
 Scirtothrips tehachapi Bailey, 1964
 Scirtothrips tenor (Bhatti & Mound, 1994)
 Scirtothrips texoloensis Johansen & Mojica-Guzman, 1999
 Scirtothrips tlaxcoensis Johansen & Mojica-Guzman, 1999
 Scirtothrips totonacus Johansen & Mojica-Guzman, 1999
 Scirtothrips willihennigi Johansen & Mojica-Guzman, 1999
 Scirtothrips zacualtipanensis Johansen & Mojica-Guzman, 1999
 Scirtothrips zuluensis Faure, 1929

References

Thrips genera
Thripidae